James Hernandez may refer to:
 James Chico Hernandez, American sambo practitioner
 James Hernandez (figure skater), English ice dancer